Afroza Sultana Ratna (known by her stage name Shabana) is a Bangladeshi film actress. She earned a total of ten Bangladesh National Film Awards. Her national film award-winning roles were in Janani (1977), Sokhi Tumi Kar (1980), Dui Poisar Alta (1982), Nazma (1983), Bhat De (1984), Apeksha (1987), Ranga Bhabi (1989), Moroner Pore (1990) and Achena (1991). Across her three-decade-long career, she appeared in 299 films. She co-starred with Alamgir in 130 of them.

Filmography

Other Bengali films

References

Bangladeshi filmographies